Newry Islands is a national park in North Queensland, Australia, 847km northwest of Brisbane. It lies within the Great Barrier Reef World Heritage Area.

See also

 Protected areas of Queensland

References

National parks of Queensland
Protected areas established in 1938
North Queensland